The Velvet Rage: Overcoming the Pain of Growing Up Gay in a Straight Man's World is an influential 2005 book by Alan Downs, a clinical psychologist. It argues that shame is a significant motivation for many gay men.

Reviews in the Toronto Star and the Washington Blade found the book to make overgeneralizations.

A second edition was published in 2012.

References

Self-help books
Psychology books
2000s LGBT literature